The Union Township School District is a community public school district that serves students in kindergarten through eighth grade from Union Township, in Hunterdon County, New Jersey, United States. A new elementary school, named "Union Township Elementary School", opened for the 2006-2007 school year. The older building was renamed Union Township Middle School.

As of the 2018–19 school year, the district, comprising two schools, had an enrollment of 436 students and 44.8 classroom teachers (on an FTE basis), for a student–teacher ratio of 9.7:1.

The district is classified by the New Jersey Department of Education as being in District Factor Group "GH", the third-highest of eight groupings. District Factor Groups organize districts statewide to allow comparison by common socioeconomic characteristics of the local districts. From lowest socioeconomic status to highest, the categories are A, B, CD, DE, FG, GH, I and J.

Public school students in ninth through twelfth grades attend North Hunterdon High School in Annandale, which also serves students from Bethlehem Township, Clinton Town, Clinton Township, Franklin Township and Lebanon Borough. As of the 2018–19 school year, the high school had an enrollment of 1,584 students and 123.2 classroom teachers (on an FTE basis), for a student–teacher ratio of 12.9:1. The school is part of the North Hunterdon-Voorhees Regional High School District, which also includes students from Califon, Glen Gardner, Hampton, High Bridge, Lebanon Township and Tewksbury Township, who attend Voorhees High School in Lebanon Township.

Schools
Schools in the district (with 2018–19 enrollment data from the National Center for Education Statistics) are:
Elementary school
Union Township Elementary School with 207 students in grades K-4
Rhonda Pevorus
Middle school
Union Township Middle School with 225 students in grades 5-8
Kerry Foote, Principal

Extracurricular activities
Union Township Middle School offers a wide variety of after school activities; student council,  drama club,  volleyball, baseball, softball, boys and girls basketball, boys and girls soccer, cheerleading, cross-country, science club, computer club, as well as art club along with National Junior Honor Society.

Administration
Core members of the district's administration are:
Nicholas A. Diaz, Superintendent
Patricia Martucci, Business Administrator / Board Secretary

Board of administration
The district's board of education, with nine members, sets policy and oversees the fiscal and educational operation of the district through its administration. As a Type II school district, the board's trustees are elected directly by voters to serve three-year terms of office on a staggered basis, with three seats up for election each year held (since 2012) as part of the November general election.

References

External links
Union Township School District

School Data for the Union Township School, National Center for Education Statistics
North Hunterdon-Voorhees Regional High School District

Union Township, Hunterdon County, New Jersey
New Jersey District Factor Group GH
School districts in Hunterdon County, New Jersey